Afghanistan competed at the 1972 Summer Olympics in Munich, West Germany from August 26, 1972, to September 11, 1972. They sent eight athletes who all competed in wrestling.

Wrestling

Men's freestyle

Men's Greco-Roman

References

Nations at the 1972 Summer Olympics
1972
1972 in Afghan sport